Cipangocharax okamurai is a species of small tropical land snails with an operculum, terrestrial gastropod mollusks in the family Cyclophoridae.

This species is  endemic to Japan.

References

Molluscs of Japan
Cipangocharax
Gastropods described in 1980
Taxonomy articles created by Polbot